The  Phoenix Cardinals season was the franchise's 95th season, 74th season in the National Football League, their 6th in Arizona, and their last as the Phoenix Cardinals (becoming the Arizona Cardinals the following season). The team improved upon their previous output of 4–12, winning seven games. Despite the improvement, the Cardinals failed to qualify to the playoffs for the eleventh straight season. It was not enough for head coach Joe Bugel to keep his job; he was fired 23 days following the season finale.

The Cardinals outscored their opponents by 57 points (326–269), the last time they would finish with a positive scoring margin until 2007. The only season since 1994 in which Arizona had a better point differential than 1993 was in 2015, when it went 13–3 and compiled a franchise record plus-176 margin.

Offseason

NFL Draft

Personnel

Staff

Roster

Schedule

Standings

References

External links
 1993 Phoenix Cardinals at Pro-Football-Reference.com

1993
Phoenix Cardinals
Phoenix